First Church of Christ, Scientist, located at 102 West University Parkway, across from the campus of Johns Hopkins University, in the Tuscany-Canterbury neighborhood of Baltimore, Maryland, in the United States is an historic structure that on December 27, 1982, was added to the National Register of Historic Places.

History
First Church of Christ, Scientist was built in 1911 by noted Baltimore architect, Charles E. Cassell, who designed the Chapel at the University of Virginia.

Current use
First Church of Christ, Scientist is still an active Christian Science church.

See also
List of Registered Historic Places in Maryland
 First Church of Christ, Scientist (disambiguation)

References

External links
 First Church Baltimore web page 
, including photo from 1982, at Maryland Historical Trust

Properties of religious function on the National Register of Historic Places in Baltimore
Christian Science churches in the United States
Neoclassical architecture in Maryland
Churches in Baltimore
Tuscany-Canterbury, Baltimore
Churches on the National Register of Historic Places in Maryland
Neoclassical church buildings in the United States